Xestospiza conica is an extinct species of bird with a cone-shaped bill that was described on the basis of fossils. It was possibly an insectivore, populating the Hawaiian Island of Kauai.

See also
Xestospiza fastigialis

References

Further reading

External links
ornitaxa.com entry

Hawaiian honeycreepers
Late Quaternary prehistoric birds
Extinct birds of Hawaii
Prehistoric birds of Oceania
Fossils of the United States
Holocene extinctions
Fossil taxa described in 1991
Taxa named by Helen F. James